Leela Charitra is a biography of Chakradhar Swami, the guru of the Mahanubhava sect, and is a sacred text of that sect.  It was written in the late 13th century by his follower Mhaimbhat.

The Lilacharitra, though written in Marathi, is replete with Kannada words.

References

Hindu literature
Mahanubhava sect